HMS Opossum was a modified Black Swan-class sloop of the Royal Navy. She was laid down by William Denny and Brothers, Dumbarton on 28 July 1943, launched on 30 November 1944 and commissioned on 16 June 1945, with the pennant number U33.

References

Further reading 
 
 
 
 
 

 

Black Swan-class sloops
Sloops of the United Kingdom
Ships built on the River Clyde
1944 ships
Korean War sloops of the United Kingdom